This is the discography of American duo Megan and Liz.

Extended plays

Singles

Covers

Music videos

References

Discographies of American artists